Midvale station may refer to:

 Midvale Center station, a light rail station in Midvale, Utah
 Midvale Fort Union station, a light rail station in Midvale, Utah
 a fictional railway station near St. Louis, Missouri, where the television series Casey Jones was set